James Cartmell is an English actor. After his role in the West End production of Milked, Cartmell became the voice of the titular character in the British version of the Where's Waldo television series, named Where's Wally after the book series of the same name. In the United Kingdom, he also voices Gilber Barker in the 2021 Netflix series Go, Dog. Go!.

Early life and education
James was born in Lancashire, England. He began acting and voice lessons in 2007. He attended Kirkham Grammar School, a private school located in Lancashire. In his early years at school he was passionate about music, sports and was involved in athletics at a competitive level with UK Athletics. For his final year at the school, Cartmell stopped athletics and switched his focus to music and performance. Cartmell then joined his local theatre school, Lytham Academy of Theatre Arts (LATA), and appeared in the school's production of Oliver! in 2017 and was a finalist at the Ares Production’s ‘A Night at the Agora 2017’ in Manchester.

After graduating high school, Cartmell signed with a talent agent and went on to train at Cynthia Bain's Young Actor Studio in Los Angeles.

Cartmell resides in both Los Angeles and the United Kingdom.

He supports Arsenal Football Club.

Career
Cartmell made his first West End appearance in the production of Milked by Simon Longman at the Arts Theatre in London. Shortly after, Cartmell played the role of the Mind in 'Borderline Electra', written by Stevie Helps, in Manchester at The Lowry. In late 2019, he was invited to an audition in London, where he became the voice role for Wally in the DreamWorks Animation Television series Where's Wally which is an adaptation of the well known book series, the show is available on Sky UK. The series was renewed for a second season which has now been released.

On 18 December 2020, it was announced he would be playing the voice of Gilber in the Netflix original series Go, Dog. Go!. The show is based on the book of the same name by P.D. Eastman, and premiered on Netflix 26 January 2021. In November 2021, he had a guest star role in the BBC television series Doctors. On September 19th 2022  the third season of Go, Dog. Go! was released.

Filmography

Television

References

External links
 
 

People educated at Kirkham Grammar School
Male actors from Lancashire
Living people
Year of birth missing (living people)